The 2022 ISSF World Cup is the annual edition of the ISSF World Cup in the Olympic shooting events, governed by the International Shooting Sport Federation.

Calendar
The calendar for the 2022 World Cup include 7 stages.

Men's results

Rifle events

Pistol events

Shotgun events

Team Results

Women's results

Rifle events

Pistol events

Shotgun events

Team Results

Mixed team results

Medal table

References 

ISSF World Cup
ISSF